Las Brizas Airport  is an airstrip serving the village of Las Brizas on the headwaters of the Matos River in the Beni Department of Bolivia.

See also

Transport in Bolivia
List of airports in Bolivia

References

External links 
OpenStreetMap - Las Brizas
Bing Maps - Las Brizas
OurAirports - Las Brizas

Airports in Beni Department